Gendron is a French surname. Notable people with the surname include:
 Annick Gendron (1939–2008), French abstract painter
 Corinne Gendron (born 1968), Canadian academic and sociologist
 Dennis Gendron (1957-2021), American ice hockey coach
 Ferdinand-Ambroise Gendron (1856–1917), Canadian lumber merchant and politician
 François Gendron (born 1944), Canadian politician
 François-Eric Gendron (born 1954), French actor
 Jean-Guy Gendron (born 1934), Canadian ice hockey player
 Lucien Henri Gendron (1899–1959), Canadian politician
 Martin Gendron (born 1974), Canadian ice hockey player
 Maurice Gendron (1920–1990), French cellist and teacher
 Monique Gendron, Canadian organist
 Odore Joseph Gendron (1921–2020), American Roman Catholic Church bishop
 Payton Gendron (born 2003), perpetrator of the 2022 Buffalo shooting
 Peter (Pierre) Gendron (1844–1910), founder of the Gendron Wheel Company
 Pierre Gendron (1916–1984), Canadian academic
 Pierre-Samuel Gendron (1828–1889), Canadian politician
 Romuald Montézuma Gendron (1865–1946), Canadian politician
 Rosaire Gendron (1920–1986), Canadian politician
 Stéphane Gendron (born 1967), Canadian politician and political analyst

See also
 
 
 Gendron Commission, 1968 Commission of Inquiry on the Situation of the French Language and Linguistic Rights in Quebec, Canada